'Te Hui Ahurei a Tuhoe' is a festival that was created in 1971 by John Rangihau for the Iwi nation in Ngai Tuhoe. All of the kapa haka teams that come of the Iwi nation perform to celebrate all the years spent on interacting with each other. The festival is held in Ruatoki biannually. The Tuhoe Ahurei committee is led by Pou Temara and Turuhira Hare.

Each group is required to perform acts which include waiata tira, whakaeke, wero, haka peruperu, and karanga.
The performances take place on stage in front of the judges (who are specifically from the Iwi nation).

In 2011, a celebration of the festival spanning 40 years took place.

References

Folk festivals in New Zealand
Festivals established in 1971
Cultural festivals in New Zealand
Māori festivals